Julius Augustus Lemcke (1832 - 1911) was State Treasurer of Indiana and wrote a memoir titled Reminiscences of an Indianian From the Sassafras Log Behind the Barn in Posey County to Broader Fields.

Lemcke was born in Hamburg, Germany.

Lemcke was the majority owner of a steamboat. He also owned a hotel. He built the Lemcke Building.

References

Date of birth unknown
Date of death unknown

1832 births
1911 deaths